The xiaosheng is a male role type in Chinese opera and a subtype of the sheng. Most xiaosheng characters are young Confucian scholars or, less often, young warriors.

Unlike laosheng actors, xiaosheng actors do not wear a beard. However, not all beardless roles are necessarily xiaosheng, for example eunuchs (huanguan) can be played by xiaosheng, chou, jing, or longtao actors (extras).

Subtypes

Confucian scholars and officials
He wears the rujin ("Confucian cloth") on his head and often holds a hand fan. This role is often featured in romantic dramas and requires the ability to play with the fan to exude an air of elegance and class.

A slightly different version is the qiongsheng ("poor sheng"), also known as kusheng ("suffering sheng") or xiepisheng ("shoe-skin sheng"), the impoverished young scholar. Although optimistic for the future, he is dejected and frustrated, and drags his feet in half-on shoes when he walks. In kunqu, he sings and talks with a "sad sound" and does not dance.

He wears the futou and a belt which could only be worn by government officials.

Warriors
Beardless warriors who only "fight" on stage are considered wusheng rather than xiaosheng. However, the young warrior who sings is known as the wuxiaosheng ("martial xiaosheng"). A zhiweisheng actor must be skilled at handling the feathers with their hands to express emotions.

In Cantonese opera, the leading male role is usually the wenwusheng (Hakka: vun-vu-sang, "civil wusheng") which combined the xiaosheng and the wusheng into one role. (On the other hand, the junior wenwusheng or the secondary male role is known as the xiaosheng or siu-saang.) This role type is also present in Hakka opera.

Others
Jia Baoyu (an aristocrat), Tang Sanzang (Buddhist monk), Xu Xian (physician), Jiang Yuhan (actor) and Han Xiangzi (mythological figure) are examples of other xiaosheng characters.

Vocal techniques
In Peking opera, the xiaosheng's singing style is a mix between falsetto and chest voice and is therefore known as the "yin-yang voice".

References

Chinese opera